Friern Barnet Urban District was a local government area in Middlesex, England created in 1883 from the civil parish Friern Barnet.  It was succeeded by the London Borough of Barnet in 1965 as one of the smaller of its contributory predecessor districts.  It was at the local level governed for nine years by the local board, then by Friern Barnet Urban District Council which operated primarily with separate functions from the County Council, operating occasionally for major planning decisions and major projects together with that body, Middlesex County Council.

Layout and two main settlements

(specifically its Muswell Hill part) and was half as wide as long.  The parish largely formed a counter-projection into the Chipping Barnet (also known as High Barnet or Barnet)-Totteridge projection of Hertfordshire into Middlesex to its north. In the north its land was the gentle, broad east escarpment above the head of the Dollis Brook rather than others which are higher and have several limbs around Barnet.  In its south the land is gradually lower and a nascent brook feeds west to east, Bounds Green brook.

The parish/district had one main road; it was bisected lengthways by (the) High Road, the main road in the area, today the A1000 and part of the traditional Great North Road from London to Edinburgh.

Until the mid 19th century the ancient parish of Friern Barnet, a depopulated medieval village — the manor house, manor barn, farm and church of which survived, had two tiny developed clusters: Whetstone in the far north and Colney Hatch in the south.  Friern Barnet remained its ecclesiastical parish. Its civil form created in the mid 19th century took over the wide-ranging powers of the vestry; in a matter of decades it was largely supplanted by a Local Board on creation of Friern Barnet Urban District and as to some powers by Middlesex County Council.

Planned urbanisation
In common with most outer London areas, the vast bulk of housing was built after the coming of the railways and in this case mainly between the 1851 construction of New Southgate railway station near Colney Hatch (just within the south-east border) and the outbreak of World War II.  A second station followed in 1871 which is a short distance from the north-west corner of the District and which is on the High Barnet branch of the Northern Line: Totteridge & Whetstone tube station. This led to high demand for housing in that area of the District.

The statistics in the panel to the right show the population change, accordingly.

References

History of the London Borough of Barnet
Districts abolished by the London Government Act 1963
Local Government Districts created by the Local Government Act 1858
Districts of England created by the Local Government Act 1894
History of local government in London (1889–1965)
History of local government in Middlesex
Friern Barnet